The Rain People is a 1969 American drama film written and directed by Francis Ford Coppola, starring Shirley Knight, James Caan and Robert Duvall. Coppola's friend and fellow director George Lucas worked as an aide on this film, and made a short 1968 documentary titled Filmmaker about the making of the film. The film also won the Golden Shell at the 1969 San Sebastian Film Festival.

The film received mixed reviews, but modern reception is more often positive.

The current DVD release from Warner Archive appears to be from a 16mm print.

Plot
Natalie Ravenna leaves her husband sleeping at home and sets off on a road trip in a family station wagon. She visits her parents who are quite upset with her.

At a gas station, Natalie makes a collect phone call to her husband and tells him she's pregnant. He is thrilled with the news, but she tells him that she's not ready to come back and needs time away from him.

She gives a ride to a strapping young man, Killer, who had been a college football star but had sustained a serious head injury and was given one thousand dollars to leave the school. On their first night together, in Natalie’s motel room, she orders Killer around and makes him show her his muscular body. She tells him she is pregnant and had given him the ride to have a one-night affair with him, but then she sends him to his own room.

Natalie drives Killer to the home of a one-time girlfriend of his whose father had once promised him a job, but that family wants nothing to do with him and Natalie takes him with her when she drives away. While they travel west she twice comes close to finding him work and a place to stay, only to decide that Killer would be taken advantage of. She also twice leaves him at the side of the road, only to change her mind.

During a subsequent collect call from a payphone days later, her husband pleads with her to return home, saying he will do anything to make her happy. Killer angers her by destroying the phone cord, but they continue traveling together.

Natalie is stopped by a motorcycle highway patrolman, Gordon, and receives a speeding ticket. Gordon invites her back to his trailer, and she agrees. He proves to be an unstable widower and father who mistreats his young daughter. After sending her outside so he and Natalie can have sex, he reveals the death of his wife to Natalie. Meanwhile, his daughter and Killer talk and wander the trailer park together. When Natalie tries to leave, Gordon attempts to force her to stay and prepares to rape her. Killer tries to stop Gordon by beating him, which Natalie tries and fails to stop. Gordon's daughter shoots Killer dead, leaving Natalie holding his body, sobbing, as park residents arrive and watch.

Cast
 Shirley Knight as Natalie Ravenna
 James Caan as Jimmy "Killer" Kilgannon
 Robert Duvall as Gordon
 Marya Zimmet as Rosalie
 Tom Aldredge as Mr. Alfred
 Laura Crews as Ellen
 Andrew Duncan as Artie
 Margaret Fairchild as Marion
 Sally Gracie as Beth
 Alan Manson as Lou
 Robert Modica as Vinny Ravenna
 Rain Manuel lavitoria

Production
At the time, Duvall and Caan lived with each other and were doing a few films together. Later, they and Coppola teamed for the film The Godfather.

The film features about 2-minutes and 44 seconds of footage filmed on the streets of Chattanooga, Tennessee amid the city's annual Armed Forces Parade. A majority of the clips were shot near the main intersection of what is today Martin Luther King Boulevard and Market Street.

Reception
Roger Ebert of the Chicago Sun-Times gave the film four stars out of four and compared Natalie Ravenna's quest to that of the Peter Fonda character in Easy Rider, and called them both "lineal descendants of the most typical American searcher of them all, Huckleberry Finn." He concluded: "It's difficult to say whether his film is successful or not. That's the beautiful thing about a lot of the new, experimental American directors. They'd rather do interesting things and make provocative observations than try to outflank John Ford on his way to the Great American Movie."

According to TVGuide.com: "This odd odyssey was not a hit, even though over the years it has been regarded as one of Coppola's more personal pictures and has attained a limited following." Margarita Landazuri writes on Turner Classic Movies: "It has acquired a cult status as an early feminist film for its provocative treatment of a woman seeking her own identity." The work currently has an 82% approval rating on Rotten Tomatoes. In 2015, David Canfield named The Rain People as one of Coppola's five best films, calling it "hypnotic". Filmink said "If you don’t think Caan was a great actor, go see The Rain People first, then try arguing that position."

See also
 List of American films of 1969

References

External links 
 
 
 
 
 

1969 films
1960s drama road movies
American drama road movies
1960s feminist films
Films directed by Francis Ford Coppola
Films shot in Colorado
Films shot in Nebraska
Films shot in New York (state)
Films shot in Pennsylvania
Films shot in Tennessee
Films shot in Virginia
Films shot in West Virginia
American pregnancy films
Films with screenplays by Francis Ford Coppola
Warner Bros. films
American Zoetrope films
Films scored by Ronald Stein
1960s pregnancy films
1960s English-language films
1960s American films
Films about disability